Price discrimination is a microeconomic pricing strategy where identical or largely similar goods or services are sold at different prices by the same provider in different market segments. Price discrimination is distinguished from product differentiation by the more substantial difference in production cost for the differently priced products involved in the latter strategy. Price differentiation essentially relies on the variation in the customers' willingness to pay and in the elasticity of their demand. For price discrimination to succeed, a firm must have market power, such as a dominant market share, product uniqueness, sole pricing power, etc. All prices under price discrimination are higher than the equilibrium price in a perfectly-competitive market. However, some prices under price discrimination may be lower than the price charged by a single-price monopolist.

The term differential pricing is also used to describe the practice of charging different prices to different buyers for the same quality and quantity of a product, but it can also refer to a combination of price differentiation and product differentiation. Other terms used to refer to price discrimination include "equity pricing", "preferential pricing", "dual pricing" and "tiered pricing". Within the broader domain of price differentiation, a commonly accepted classification dating to the 1920s is:
 "Personalized pricing" (or first-degree price differentiation) — selling to each customer at a different price; this is also called one-to-one marketing. The optimal incarnation of this is called "perfect price discrimination" and maximizes the price that each customer is willing to pay. 
 "Product versioning" or simply "versioning" (or second-degree price differentiation) — offering a product line by creating slightly different products for the purpose of price differentiation, i.e. a vertical product line. Another name given to versioning is "menu pricing".
 "Group pricing" (or third-degree price differentiation) — dividing the market into segments and charging a different price to each segment (but the same price to each member of that segment). This is essentially a heuristic approximation that simplifies the problem in face of the difficulties with personalized pricing. Typical examples include student discounts and seniors' discounts.

Theoretical basis
In a theoretical market with perfect information, perfect substitutes, and no transaction costs or prohibition on secondary exchange (or re-selling) to prevent arbitrage, price discrimination can only be a feature of monopolistic and oligopolistic markets, where market power can be exercised. Otherwise, the moment the seller tries to sell the same good at different prices, the buyer at the lower price can arbitrage by selling to the consumer buying at the higher price but with a tiny discount. However, product heterogeneity, market frictions or high fixed costs (which make marginal-cost pricing unsustainable in the long run) can allow for some degree of differential pricing to different consumers, even in fully competitive retail or industrial markets.

The effects of price discrimination on social efficiency are unclear. Output can be expanded when price discrimination is very efficient. Even if output remains constant, price discrimination can reduce efficiency by misallocating output among consumers.

Price discrimination requires market segmentation and some means to discourage discount customers from becoming resellers and, by extension, competitors. This usually entails using one or more means of preventing any resale: keeping the different price groups separate, making price comparisons difficult, or restricting pricing information. The boundary set up by the marketer to keep segments separate is referred to as a rate fence. Price discrimination is thus very common in services where resale is not possible; an example is student discounts at museums: In theory, students, for their condition as students, may get lower prices than the rest of the population for a certain product or service, and later will not become resellers, since what they received, may only be used or consumed by them. Another example of price discrimination is intellectual property, enforced by law and by technology.  In the market for DVDs, laws require DVD players to be designed and produced with hardware or software that prevents inexpensive copying or playing of content purchased legally elsewhere in the world at a lower price. In the US the Digital Millennium Copyright Act has provisions to outlaw circumventing of such devices to protect the enhanced monopoly profits that copyright holders can obtain from price discrimination against higher price market segments.

Price discrimination can also be seen where the requirement that goods be identical is relaxed. For example, so-called "premium products" (including relatively simple products, such as cappuccino compared to regular coffee with cream) have a price differential that is not explained by the cost of production. Some economists have argued that this is a form of price discrimination exercised by providing a means for consumers to reveal their willingness to pay.

Price discrimination differentiates the willingness to pay of the customers, in order to eliminate as much consumer surplus as possible. By understanding the elasticity of the customer's demand, a business could use its market power to identify the customers' willingness to pay. Different people would pay a different price for the same product when price discrimination exists in the market. When a company recognized a consumer that has a lower willingness to pay, the company could use the price discrimination strategy in order to maximized the firm's profit.

First degree
Exercising first degree (or perfect or primary) price discrimination requires the monopoly seller of a good or service to know the absolute maximum price (or reservation price) that every consumer is willing to pay. By knowing the reservation price, the seller is able to sell the good or service to each consumer at the maximum price they are willing to pay, and thus transform the consumer surplus into revenues, leading it to be the most profitable form of price discrimination. So the profit is equal to the sum of consumer surplus and producer surplus. First-degree price discrimination is the most profitable as it obtains all of the consumer surplus and each consumer buys the good at the highest price they are willing to pay. The marginal consumer is the one whose reservation price equals the marginal cost of the product, meaning that the social surplus comes entirely from producer surplus, which is obviously beneficial for the firm. The seller produces more of their product than they would achieve monopoly profits with no price discrimination, which means that there is no deadweight loss. During first-degree price discrimination, the firm produces the amount where marginal benefit equals marginal cost, and fully maximizes producer surplus. Examples of this might be observed in markets where consumers bid for tenders, though, in this case, the practice of collusive tendering could reduce the market efficiency.

Second degree
In second-degree price discrimination, price varies according to quantity demanded. Larger quantities are available at a lower unit price. This is particularly widespread in sales to industrial customers, where bulk buyers enjoy  discounts.

Additionally to second-degree price discrimination, sellers are not able to differentiate between different types of consumers. Thus, the suppliers will provide incentives for the consumers to differentiate themselves according to preference, which is done by quantity "discounts", or non-linear pricing. This allows the supplier to set different prices to the different groups and capture a larger portion of the total market surplus.

In reality, different pricing may apply to differences in product quality as well as quantity. For example, airlines often offer multiple classes of seats on flights, such as first-class and economy class, with the first-class passengers receiving wine, beer and spirits with their ticket and the economy passengers offered only juice, pop, and water. This is a way to differentiate consumers based on preference, and therefore allows the airline to capture more consumer's surplus.

Third degree

Third-degree price discrimination means charging a different price to different consumers in a given number of groups and being able to distinguish between the groups to charge a separate monopoly price. For example, rail and tube (subway) travelers can be subdivided into commuters and casual travelers, and cinema goers can be subdivided into adults and children, with some theatres also offering discounts to full-time students and seniors. Splitting the market into peak and off-peak use of service is very common and occurs with gas, electricity, and telephone supply, as well as gym membership and parking charges. Some parking lots charge less for "early bird" customers who arrive at the parking lot before a certain time.

(Some of these examples are not pure "price discrimination", in that the differential price is related to production costs: the marginal cost of providing electricity or car parking spaces is very low outside peak hours. Incentivizing consumers to switch to off-peak usage is done as much to minimize costs as to maximize revenue.)

There are limits for price discrimination as well. When price discrimination exists in a market, the consumer surplus and producer surplus will be affected by its existence. In order to offer different prices for different groups of people in the aggregate market, the business has to use additional information to identify its consumers. Consequently, they will be involved in third-degree price discrimination.  With third-degree price discrimination, the firms try to generate sales by identifying different market segments, such as domestic and industrial users, with different price elasticities. Markets must be kept separate by time, physical distance, and nature of use. For example, Microsoft Office Schools edition is available for a lower price to educational institutions than to other users. The markets cannot overlap so that consumers who purchase at a lower price in the elastic sub-market could resell at a higher price in the inelastic sub-market. The company must also have monopoly power to make price discrimination more effective.

Two-part tariff

The two-part tariff is another form of price discrimination where the producer charges an initial fee and a secondary fee for the use of the product. This pricing strategy yields a result similar to second-degree price discrimination. An example of two-part tariff pricing is in the market for shaving razors. The customer pays an initial cost for the razor and then pays again for the replacement blades. This pricing strategy works because it shifts the demand curve to the right: since the customer has already paid for the initial blade holder and will continue to buy the blades which are cheaper than buying disposable razors.

Combination
These types are not mutually exclusive. Thus a company may vary pricing by location, but then offer bulk discounts as well. Airlines use several different types of price discrimination, including:

 Bulk discounts to wholesalers, consolidators, and tour operators
 Incentive discounts for higher sales volumes to travel agents and corporate buyers
 Seasonal discounts, incentive discounts, and even general prices that vary by location. The price of a flight from say, Singapore to Beijing can vary widely if one buys the ticket in Singapore compared to Beijing (or New York or Tokyo or elsewhere).
 Discounted tickets requiring advance purchase and/or Saturday stays.  Both restrictions have the effect of excluding business travelers, who typically travel during the workweek and arrange trips on shorter notice.
 First degree price discrimination based on customer. Hotel or car rental firms may quote higher prices to their loyalty program's top tier members than to the general public.

Modern taxonomy

The first/second/third degree taxonomy of price discrimination is due to Pigou (Economics of Welfare, 3rd edition, 1929). However, these categories are not mutually exclusive or exhaustive. Ivan Png (Managerial Economics, 1998: 301-315) suggests an alternative taxonomy:
Complete discrimination where the seller prices each unit at a different price, so that each user purchases up to the point where the user's marginal benefit equals the marginal cost of the item;
Direct segmentation where the seller can condition price on some attribute (like age or gender) that directly segments the buyers;
Indirect segmentation where the seller relies on some proxy (e.g., package size, usage quantity, coupon) to structure a choice that indirectly segments the buyers;
Uniform pricing where the seller sets the same price for each unit of the product.

The hierarchy—complete/direct/indirect/uniform pricing—is in decreasing order of profitability and information requirement. Complete price discrimination is most profitable, and requires the seller to have the most information about buyers. Next most profitable and in information requirement is direct segmentation, followed by indirect segmentation. Finally, uniform pricing is the least profitable and requires the seller to have the least information about buyers is.

Explanation

The purpose of price discrimination is generally to capture the market's consumer surplus. This surplus arises because, in a market with a single clearing price, some customers (the very low price elasticity segment) would have been prepared to pay more than the single market price. Price discrimination transfers some of this surplus from the consumer to the producer/marketer. It is a way of increasing monopoly profit. In a perfectly-competitive market, manufacturers make normal profit, but not monopoly profit, so they cannot engage in price discrimination.

It can be argued that strictly, a consumer surplus need not exist, for example where fixed costs or economies of scale mean that the marginal cost of adding more consumers is less than the marginal profit from selling more product. This means that charging some consumers less than an even share of costs can be beneficial. An example is a high-speed internet connection shared by two consumers in a single building; if one is willing to pay less than half the cost of connecting the building, and the other willing to make up the rest but not to pay the entire cost, then price discrimination can allow the purchase to take place. However, this will cost the consumers as much or more than if they pooled their money to pay a non-discriminating price. If the consumer is considered to be the building, then a consumer surplus goes to the inhabitants.

It can be proved mathematically that a firm facing a downward sloping demand curve that is convex to the origin will always obtain higher revenues under price discrimination than under a single price strategy. This can also be shown geometrically.

In the top diagram, a single price  is available to all customers. The amount of revenue is represented by area . The consumer surplus is the area above line segment  but below the demand curve .

With price discrimination, (the bottom diagram), the demand curve is divided into two segments ( and ). A higher price  is charged to the low elasticity segment, and a lower price  is charged to the high elasticity segment. The total revenue from the first segment is equal to the area . The total revenue from the second segment is equal to the area . The sum of these areas will always be greater than the area without discrimination assuming the demand curve resembles a rectangular hyperbola with unitary elasticity. The more prices that are introduced, the greater the sum of the revenue areas, and the more of the consumer surplus is captured by the producer.

The above requires both first and second degree price discrimination: the right segment corresponds partly to different people than the left segment, partly to the same people, willing to buy more if the product is cheaper.

It is very useful for the price discriminator to determine the optimum prices in each market segment. This is done in the next diagram where each segment is considered as a separate market with its own demand curve. As usual, the profit maximizing output (Qt) is determined by the intersection of the marginal cost curve (MC) with the marginal revenue curve for the total market (MRt).

The firm decides what amount of the total output to sell in each market by looking at the intersection of marginal cost with marginal revenue (profit maximization). This output is then divided between the two markets, at the equilibrium marginal revenue level.

The marginal revenue in both markets at the optimal output levels must be equal, otherwise the firm could profit from transferring output over to whichever market is offering higher marginal revenue.

The price in a perfectly-competitive market will always be lower than any price under price discrimination (including in special cases like the internet connection example above, assuming that the perfectly competitive market allows consumers to pool their resources). In a market with perfect competition, no price discrimination is possible, and the average total cost (ATC) curve will be identical to the marginal cost curve (MC). The price will be the intersection of this ATC/MC curve and the demand line (Dt). The consumer thus buys the product at the cheapest price at which any manufacturer can produce any quantity.

Price discrimination is a sign that the market is imperfect, the seller has some monopoly power, and that prices and seller profits are higher than they would be in a perfectly competitive market.

Price discrimination in oligopoly 
An oligopoly forms when a small group of business dominates an industry. When the dominating companies in an oligopoly model compete in prices, the motive for inter-temporal price discrimination would appear in the oligopoly market. Price discrimination can be facilitated by inventory controls in oligopoly.

Advantages of price discrimination

 Firms that hold some monopolistic or oliogopolistic power will be able to increase their revenue. In theory, they might also use the money for investment which benefit consumers, like research and development, though this is more common in a competitive market where innovation brings temporary market power.
 Lower prices (for some) than in a one-price monopoly. Even the lowest "discounted" prices will be higher than the price in a competitive market, which is equal to the cost of production. For example, trains tend to be near-monopolies (see natural monopoly). So old people may get lower train fares than they would if everyone got the same price, because the train company knows that old people are more likely to be poor. Also, customers willing to spend time in researching ‘special offers’ get lower prices; their effort acts as an honest signal of their price-sensitivity, by reducing their consumer surplus by the value of the time spent hunting.

True price discrimination occurs when exactly the same product is sold at multiple prices. It benefits only the seller, compared to a competitive market. It benefits some buyers at a (greater) cost to others, causing a net loss to consumers, compared to a single-price monopoly. For congestion pricing, which can benefit the buyer and is not price discrimination, see counterexamples below.

Disadvantages of price discrimination

 Higher prices. Under price discrimination, all consumers will pay higher prices than they would in a competitive market. Some consumers will end up paying higher prices than they would in a single-price monopoly. These higher prices are likely to be allocatively inefficient because P MC.
 Decline in consumer surplus. Price discrimination enables a transfer of money from consumers to firms – increasing wealth inequality.
 Potentially unfair. Those who pay higher prices may not be the richest. For example, adults paying full price could be unemployed, senior citizens can be very well off.
 Administration costs. There will be administration costs in separating the markets, which could lead to higher prices.
 Predatory pricing. Profits from price discrimination could be used to finance predatory pricing. Predatory pricing can be used to maintain the monopolistic power needed to price-discriminate.

Examples

Retail price discrimination
Manufacturers may sell their products to similarly situated retailers at different prices based solely on the volume of products purchased. Sometimes, the firm investigate the consumers’ purchase histories which would show the customer's unobserved willingness to pay. Each customer has a purchasing score which indicates his or her preferences; consequently, the firm will be able to set the price for the individual customer at the point that minimizes the consumer surplus. Oftentimes, consumers are not aware of the ways to manipulate that score. If he or she wants to do to so, he or she could reduce the demand to reduce the average equilibrium price, which will reduce the firm's price discriminating strategy.

Travel industry
Airlines and other travel companies use differentiated pricing regularly, as they sell travel products and services simultaneously to different market segments. This is often done by assigning capacity to various booking classes, which sell for different prices and which may be linked to fare restrictions. The restrictions or "fences" help ensure that market segments buy in the booking class range that has been established for them. For example, schedule-sensitive business passengers who are willing to pay $300 for a seat from city A to city B cannot purchase a $150 ticket because the $150 booking class contains a requirement for a Saturday-night stay, or a 15-day advance purchase, or another fare rule that discourages, minimizes, or effectively prevents a sale to business passengers.

Notice however that in this example "the seat" is not always the same product. That is, the business person who purchases the $300 ticket may be willing to do so in return for a seat on a high-demand morning flight, for full refundability if the ticket is not used, and for the ability to upgrade to first class if space is available for a nominal fee. On the same flight are price-sensitive passengers who are not willing to pay $300, but who are willing to fly on a lower-demand flight (one leaving an hour earlier), or via a connection city (not a non-stop flight), and who are willing to forgo refundability.

On the other hand, an airline may also apply differential pricing to "the same seat" over time, e.g. by discounting the price for an early or late booking and for weekend purchases (without changing any other fare condition). It is part of an airline’s profit-maximizing strategy by segmenting price-sensitive leisure travellers from price inelastic business travellers as the former often have an incentive to buy in advance and often purchase on weekends. This could present an arbitrage opportunity in the absence of any restriction on reselling. However, passenger name changes are typically prevented or financially penalized by contract.

In addition, an airline may apply directional price discrimination by charging passengers different roundtrip fares based on their origins. For example, the per capita income of City A is $30,000 higher than City B and the finding implies that passengers originating from City A will pay $5400 - $12900 more than those from City B. It is argued that this price discrimination method is the result of airlines segmenting passenger price sensitivity based on their income of route endpoints.

Since airlines often fly multi-leg flights, and since no-show rates vary by segment, competition for the seat has to take in the spatial dynamics of the product. Someone trying to fly A-B is competing with people trying to fly A-C through city B on the same aircraft. This is one reason airlines use yield management technology to determine how many seats to allot for A-B passengers, B-C passengers, and A-B-C passengers, at their varying fares and with varying demands and no-show rates.

With the rise of the Internet and the growth of low fare airlines, airfare pricing transparency has become far more pronounced. Passengers discovered it is quite easy to compare fares across different flights or different airlines. This helped put pressure on airlines to lower fares. Meanwhile, in the recession following the September 11, 2001, attacks on the U.S., business travelers and corporate buyers made it clear to airlines that they were not going to be buying air travel at rates high enough to subsidize lower fares for non-business travelers. This prediction has come true, as vast numbers of business travelers are buying airfares only in economy class for business travel.

There are sometimes group discounts on rail tickets and passes. This may be in view of the alternative of going by car together.

Coupons 
The use of coupons in retail is an attempt to distinguish customers by their reserve price.  The assumption is that people who go through the trouble of collecting coupons have greater price sensitivity than those who do not.  Thus, making coupons available enables, for instance, breakfast cereal makers to charge higher prices to price-insensitive customers, while still making some profit off customers who are more price-sensitive.

Premium pricing
For certain products, premium products are priced at a level (compared to "regular" or "economy" products) that is well beyond their marginal cost of production. For example, a coffee chain may price regular coffee at $1, but "premium" coffee at $2.50 (where the respective costs of production may be $0.90 and $1.25). Economists such as Tim Harford in the Undercover Economist have argued that this is a form of price discrimination: by providing a choice between a regular and premium product, consumers are being asked to reveal their degree of price sensitivity (or willingness to pay) for comparable products. Similar techniques are used in pricing business class airline tickets and premium alcoholic drinks, for example.

This effect can lead to (seemingly) perverse incentives for the producer. If, for example, potential business class customers will pay a large price differential only if economy class seats are uncomfortable while economy class customers are more sensitive to price than comfort, airlines may have substantial incentives to purposely make economy seating uncomfortable. In the example of coffee, a restaurant may gain more economic profit by making poor quality regular coffee—more profit is gained from up-selling to premium customers than is lost from customers who refuse to purchase inexpensive but poor quality coffee. In such cases, the net social utility should also account for the "lost" utility to consumers of the regular product, although determining the magnitude of this foregone utility may not be feasible.

Segmentation by age group, student status, ethnicity and citizenship
Many movie theaters, amusement parks, tourist attractions, and other places have different admission prices per market segment: typical groupings are Youth/Child, Student, Adult, Senior Citizen, Local and Foreigner. Each of these groups typically have a much different demand curve. Children, people living on student wages, and people living on retirement generally have much less disposable income. Foreigners may be perceived as being more wealthy than locals and therefore being capable of paying more for goods and services - sometimes this can be even 35 times as much. Market stall-holders and individual public transport providers may also insist on higher prices for their goods and services when dealing with foreigners (sometimes called the "White Man Tax"). Some goods - such as housing - may be offered at cheaper prices for certain ethnic groups.

Discounts for members of certain occupations
Some businesses may offer reduced prices members of some occupations, such as school teachers (see below), police and military personnel. In addition to increased sales to the target group, businesses benefit from the resulting positive publicity, leading to increased sales to the general public.

Retail incentives
A variety of incentive techniques may be used to increase market share or revenues at the retail level. These include discount coupons, rebates, bulk and quantity pricing, seasonal discounts, and frequent buyer discounts.

Incentives for industrial buyers
Many methods exist to incentivize wholesale or industrial buyers. These may be quite targeted, as they are designed to generate specific activity, such as buying more frequently, buying more regularly, buying in bigger quantities, buying new products with established ones, and so on. They may also be designed to reduce the administrative and finance costs of processing each transaction. Thus, there are bulk discounts, special pricing for long-term commitments, non-peak discounts, discounts on high-demand goods to incentivize buying lower-demand goods, rebates, and many others. This can help the relations between the firms involved.

Gender-based examples

Gender-based price discrimination is the practice of offering identical or similar services and products to men and women at different prices when the cost of producing the products and services is the same. In the United States, gender-based price discrimination has been a source of debate. In 1992, the New York City Department of Consumer Affairs (“DCA”) conducted an investigation of “price bias against women in the marketplace”. The DCA's investigation concluded that women paid more than men at used car dealers, dry cleaners, and hair salons. The DCA's research on gender pricing in New York City brought national attention to gender-based price discrimination and the financial impact it has on women.

With consumer products, differential pricing is usually not based explicitly on the actual gender of the purchaser, but is achieved implicitly by the use of differential packaging, labelling, or colour schemes designed to appeal to male or female consumers. In many cases, where the product is marketed to make an attractive gift, the gender of the purchaser may be different from that of the end user.

In 1995, California Assembly's Office of Research studied the issue of gender-based price discrimination of services and estimated that women effectively paid an annual “gender tax” of approximately $1,351.00 for the same services as men. It was also estimated that women, over the course of their lives, spend thousands of dollars more than men to purchase similar products. For example, prior to the enactment of the Patient Protection and Affordable Care Act (“Affordable Care Act”), health insurance companies charged women higher premiums for individual health insurance policies than men. Under the Affordable Care Act, health insurance companies are now required to offer the same premium price to all applicants of the same age and geographical locale without regard to gender. However, there is no federal law banning gender-based price discrimination in the sale of products. Instead, several cities and states have passed legislation prohibiting gender-based price discrimination on products and services.

In Europe, motor insurance premiums have historically been higher for men than for women, a practice that the insurance industry attempts to justify on the basis of different levels of risk. The EU has banned this practice; however, there is evidence that it is being replaced by "proxy discrimination", that is, discrimination on the basis of factors that are strongly correlated with gender: for example, charging construction workers more than midwives.

In Chinese retail automobile market, researchers found that male buyers pay less than female buyers for cars with the same characteristics. Although this research documented the existence of price discrimination between locals and non-locals, local men still receive $221.63 discount more than local women and non-local men receive $330.19 discount more than non-local women. The discount represents approximately 10% of average personal budget, considering the per capita GDP for 2018.

International price discrimination
Pharmaceutical companies may charge customers living in wealthier countries a much higher price than for identical drugs in poorer nations, as is the case with the sale of antiretroviral drugs in Africa. Since the purchasing power of African consumers is much lower, sales would be extremely limited without price discrimination. The ability of pharmaceutical companies to maintain price differences between countries is often either reinforced or hindered by national drugs laws and regulations, or the lack thereof.

Even online sales for non material goods, which do not have to be shipped, may change according to the geographic location of the buyer, such as music streaming services by Spotify and Apple Music. The users in lower-income countries benefit from price discrimination by paying fewer subscription fees than those in higher-income countries. The researchers also found that the cross-national price differences actually raise the revenue of those companies by about 6% while reducing world users’ welfare by 1%.

Academic pricing
Companies will often offer discounted goods and software to students and faculty at school and university levels. These may be labeled as academic versions, but perform the same as the full price retail software. Academic versions of the most expensive software suites may be free or significantly cheaper than the retail price of standard versions. Some academic software may have differing licenses than retail versions, usually disallowing their use in activities for profit or expiring the license after a given number of months. This also has the characteristics of an "initial offer" - that is, the profits from an academic customer may come partly in the form of future non-academic sales due to vendor lock-in.

Sliding scale fees
Sliding scale fees are when different customers are charged different prices based on their income, which is used as a proxy for their willingness or ability to pay. For example, some nonprofit law firms charge on a sliding scale based on income and family size. Thus the clients paying a higher price at the top of the fee scale help subsidize the clients at the bottom of the scale. This differential pricing enables the nonprofit to serve a broader segment of the market than they could if they only set one price.

Weddings

Goods and services for weddings are sometimes priced at a higher rate than identical goods for normal customers.

Obstetric service
The welfare consequences of price discrimination were assessed by testing the differences in mean prices paid by patients from three income groups: low, middle and high. The results suggest that two different forms of price discrimination for obstetric services occurred in both these hospitals. First, there was price discrimination according to income, with the poorer users benefiting from a higher discount rate than richer ones. Secondly, there was price discrimination according to social status, with three high status occupational groups (doctors, senior government officials, and large businessmen) having the highest probability of receiving some level of discount.

Pharmaceutical industry
Price discrimination is common in the pharmaceutical industry. Drug-makers charge more for drugs in wealthier countries. For example, drug prices in the United States are some of the highest in the world. Europeans, on average, pay only 56% of what Americans pay for the same prescription drugs.

Textbooks
Price discrimination is also prevalent within the textbook publishing industry. Prices for textbooks are much higher in the United States despite the fact that they are produced in the country. Copyright protection laws increase the price of textbooks. Also, textbooks are mandatory in the United States while schools in other countries see them as study aids.

Two necessary conditions for price discrimination

There are two conditions that must be met if a price discrimination scheme is to work. First the firm must be able to identify market segments by their price elasticity of demand and second the firms must be able to enforce the scheme. For example, airlines routinely engage in price discrimination by charging high prices for customers with relatively inelastic demand - business travelers - and discount prices for tourist who have relatively elastic demand.  The airlines enforce the scheme by enforcing a no resale policy on the tickets preventing a tourist from buying a ticket at a discounted price and selling it to a business traveler (arbitrage).  Airlines must also prevent business travelers from directly buying discount tickets. Airlines accomplish this by imposing advance ticketing requirements or minimum stay requirements — conditions that would be difficult for the average business traveler to meet.

User-controlled price discrimination

While the conventional theory of price discrimination generally assumes that prices are set by the seller, there is a variant form in which prices are set by the buyer, such as in the form of pay what you want pricing.  Such user-controlled price discrimination exploits similar ability to adapt to varying demand curves or individual price sensitivities, and may avoid the negative perceptions of price discrimination as imposed by a seller.

In the matching markets, the platforms will internalize the impacts in revenue to create a cross-side effects. In return, this cross-side effect will differentiate price discrimination in matching intermediation from the standard markets.

Counterexamples
Some pricing patterns appear to be price discrimination but are not.

Congestion pricing

Price discrimination only happens when the same product is sold at more than one price. Congestion pricing is not price discrimination. Peak and off-peak fares on a train are not the same product; some people have to travel during rush hour, and travelling off-peak is not equivalent to them.

Some companies have high fixed costs (like a train company, which owns a railway and rolling stock, or a restaurant, which has to pay for premises and equipment). If these fixed costs permit the company to additionally provide less-preferred products (like mid-morning meals or off-peak rail travel) at little additional cost, it can profit both seller and buyer to offer them at lower prices. Providing more product from the same fixed costs increases both producer and consumer surplus. This is not technically price discrimination (unlike, say, giving menus with higher prices to richer-looking customers, which the poorer-looking ones get an ordinary menu).

If different prices are charged for products that only some consumers will see as equivalent, the differential pricing can be used to manage demand. For instance, airlines can use price discrimination to encourage people to travel at unpopular times (early in the morning). This helps avoid over-crowding and helps to spread out demand. The airline gets better use out of planes and airports, and can thus charge less (or profit more) than if it only flew peak hours.

See also
 Dynamic pricing
 Frugal innovation
 Geo (marketing)
 Interstate Commerce Act of 1887
 Marketing
 Market segmentation
 Microeconomics
 Outline of industrial organization
 Value-based pricing
 Pay what you want
 Pricing strategies
 Ramsey problem
 Redlining
 Resale price maintenance
 Robinson–Patman Act
 Sliding scale fees
 Ticket resale
 Variable pricing
 Yield management

References

External links
 Price Discrimination and Imperfect Competition Lars Stole
 Pricing Information Hal Varian.
 Price Discrimination for Digital Goods Arun Sundararajan.
 Price Discrimination Discussion piece from The Filter
 Joelonsoftware's blog entry on Price Discrimination
 Taken to the Cleaners? Steven Landsburg's explanation of Dry Cleaner pricing.

Pricing
Ethically disputed business practices
Monopoly (economics)
Imperfect competition